Jangle is a sound associated with 12-string electric guitars.

Jangle or jangling may also refer to:

 Jangle pop, music genre
 Jangle Leg, a character from the 1999 film Life
 Jangletown, a comic collection also known as The Further Adventures of The Joker
 Jangling verse, a derogatory term for Leonine verse.
 Ola & the Janglers, Swedish pop band

See also
 Jingle Jangle (disambiguation)